Dinesh K. Patnaik  is an Indian Foreign Service officer from the 1990 cadre. Presently, he is Ambassador of India to Spain. His previous assignments have included being Ambassador of India to Cambodia, Morocco, Former Additional Secretary (IOR)  and (CPV & OIA) at Ministry of External Affairs (India)  and former Director General of the Indian Council for Cultural Relations, an autonomous organization of the Government of India.

Personal life
Ambassador Patnaik belongs to the state of Odisha. He obtained a Master of Business Administration from Indian Institute of Management Calcutta. He also holds a Master’s degree in Advanced International Studies from the University of Vienna and Certificate in International Studies from the Diplomatic Academy of Vienna. Patnaik and his wife Poonam have two daughters.

Career
He was India’s Ambassador to Morocco from September 2015 to August 2016 and after that assumed charge as the Deputy High Commissioner of India to UK, London from November 2018 to July 2019. he was Additional Secretary (IOR, CPV & OIA) from November 2018 to Feb 2020 and after that he was appointed as DG ICCR from February 2020 to December 2021 before designated as Ambassador of Spain to India.

Other details
He is a good speaker and was invited to the Jaipur Literature Festival London 2021.

References

Ambassadors of India to Morocco
Indian civil servants
Indian Institute of Management Calcutta alumni
Indian Foreign Service officers
Living people
Year of birth missing (living people)